Luc Kangny Abalo (born 6 September 1984) is a French handball player who plays for Zeekstar Tokyo.

Being a member of the national team from 2005, he won gold medals at the 2008, 2012 and 2020 Olympics, 2009, 2011 and 2017 World and 2006, 2010 and 2014 European championships. He was named the French Division 1 Player of the Year in 2007, and the league's Best Right Wing in 2005, 2006 and 2007. In 2008 he received the Legion of Honour.

Abalo is an accomplished graphical artist. Upon a request from the French Olympic Committee he designed a wristband popularizing the Paris' bid for the 2024 Summer Olympics. Approximately 1.5 million copies were sold in September 2015.

References

External links

 
 

1984 births
Living people
People from Ivry-sur-Seine
French male handball players
Handball players at the 2008 Summer Olympics
Handball players at the 2012 Summer Olympics
Handball players at the 2016 Summer Olympics
Olympic handball players of France
Olympic gold medalists for France
Olympic silver medalists for France
French sportspeople of Togolese descent
BM Ciudad Real players
Olympic medalists in handball
Medalists at the 2008 Summer Olympics
Medalists at the 2012 Summer Olympics
Medalists at the 2016 Summer Olympics
Officers of the Ordre national du Mérite
European champions for France
Expatriate handball players
French expatriate sportspeople in Spain
Liga ASOBAL players
Sportspeople from Val-de-Marne
Handball players at the 2020 Summer Olympics
Medalists at the 2020 Summer Olympics
21st-century French people